Swinkels is a Dutch toponymic surname. It is a contraction of des winkels, literally meaning "from the corner" (see Winkel (surname)). Notable people with the surname include:

 Arjan Swinkels (born 1984), Dutch football defender
 Eric Swinkels (born 1949), Dutch sports shooter
 Henri Swinkels (born 1963), Dutch politician
 (1810–1875), Dutch apostolic vicariate of Suriname
 Johannes Franciscus Swinkels (1851–1950), Dutch brewer
 Jolande Swinkels (born 1966), Dutch sports shooter
 Judith Swinkels (born 1961), Dutch politician
 Karlijn Swinkels (born 1998), Dutch road cyclist
 (born 1989), Dutch chess player
 Ruud Swinkels (born 1987), Dutch football goalkeeper
 Sil Swinkels (born 2004), Dutch football defender
 Sylvie Swinkels (born 2000), Dutch road cyclist

References

Dutch-language surnames
Toponymic surnames